Cao Zhi (May 1928 – 1 July 2020) was a Chinese politician. 

Cao was born in Anqiu, Shandong. He joined the Chinese Communist Party (CCP) in July 1947. Since then, Cao had served as the Director of Research Office of Organization Department of CCP Central Committee (1978–83), the Deputy Head of Organization Department of CCP Central Committee (1983–87), and the Deputy Director of Research Office of Secretariat of CCP Central Committee (1987–88). In 1988, he was elected the Executive Deputy Secretary-General of the 7th National People's Congress (NPC) Standing Committee. In 1993, he was elected the Secretary General of the 8th NPC Standing Committee. Later, he served as one of the Vice Chairmen of the 9th National People's Congress (1998–2003).

He died on 1 July 2020 in Beijing, aged 92. On 3 July, he was buried at Babaoshan Revolutionary Cemetery.

References

1928 births
2020 deaths
Chinese Communist Party politicians from Shandong
Politicians from Weifang
Members of the Standing Committee of the 7th National People's Congress
Members of the Standing Committee of the 8th National People's Congress
Members of the Standing Committee of the 9th National People's Congress
Vice Chairpersons of the National People's Congress
Burials at Babaoshan Revolutionary Cemetery